"Question Everything" is a song recorded by the American rock band 8stops7, from their 1999 album In Moderation. It was released in 2000 as a single. The song reached the US rock charts, peaking at number sixteen on Mainstream Rock Tracks, at number 25 on Modern Rock Tracks and at 38 in the Billboard Hot Adult top 40 chart. The song has a music video.

Chart performance

References

1999 songs
8stops7 songs
Warner Records singles
1999 singles